Hitoy Cerere Biological Reserve, is a protected area in Costa Rica, managed under the Caribbean La Amistad Conservation Area, it was created in 1971 by decree 8351-J.

References 

Nature reserves in Costa Rica
Protected areas established in 1971